The 1992–93 MetJHL season is the 2nd season of the Metro Junior A Hockey League (MetJHL). The 13 teams of the Fullan and Bauer Divisions competed in a 48-game schedule.  The top 6 teams in each division made the playoffs.

The winner of the MetJHL playoffs, the Wexford Raiders, could not proceed further in the National playdowns as the MetJHL was not a member of the Ontario Hockey Association.  However, the Raiders were permitted to play a 2-game series for charity against the OHA's Central Junior League's champion, the Barrie Colts.  The Raiders won both games.

Changes
Aurora Eagles join MetJHL from CJBHL.
Mimico Monarchs move and become the Richmond Hill Riot.
Thornhill Thunderbirds move and become the Mississauga Senators.
Richmond Hill Rams move and become the North York Rangers.

Final standings
Note: GP = Games played; W = Wins; L = Losses; OTL = Overtime losses; SL = Shootout losses; GF = Goals for; GA = Goals against; PTS = Points; x = clinched playoff berth; y = clinched division title; z = clinched conference title

1992-93 MetJHL Playoffs
Preliminary
Aurora Eagles defeated Bramalea Blues 3-games-to-1
Richmond Hill Riot defeated Kingston Voyageurs 3-games-to-none
Quarter-final
Muskoka Bears defeated Aurora Eagles 4-games-to-2
St. Michael's Buzzers defeated Mississauga Senators 4-games-to-2
Wexford Raiders defeated Richmond Hill Riot 4-games-to-none
Wellington Dukes defeated North York Rangers 4-games-to-none
Semi-final
St. Michael's Buzzers defeated Muskoka Bears 4-games-to-none
Wexford Raiders defeated Wellington Dukes 4-games-to-none
Final
Wexford Raiders defeated St. Michael's Buzzers 4-games-to-1

Exhibition Series vs. CJAHL
The Barrie Colts of the OHA's Central Junior A League and the Wexford Raiders of the Metro League played a pair of exhibition games head-to-head for charity.  The purpose of the games was to match the probably champions of the two leagues head-to-head to see where each league's talent level stood if the OHA was to allow both leagues in as sanctioned Junior A leagues for the 1993–94 season.  Wexford won both games by narrow margins, but the second game was marred by an incident involving a fight, initiated by the Barrie Colts, that spilled into the crowd.

Wexford Raiders defeated Barrie Colts (CJAHL) 7-6
Wexford Raiders defeated Barrie Colts (CJAHL) 4-3

Players selected in 1993 NHL Entry Draft
Rd 4 #97	John Jakopin -	Detroit Red Wings	(St. Michael's Buzzers)
Rd 8 #195	Thom Cullen - 	New Jersey Devils	(Wexford Raiders)
Rd 8 #198	Travis Dillabough -	Los Angeles Kings	(Wexford Raiders)

See also
 1993 Centennial Cup
 Dudley Hewitt Cup
 List of Ontario Hockey Association Junior A seasons
 Ontario Junior Hockey League
 Northern Ontario Junior Hockey League
 1992 in ice hockey
 1993 in ice hockey

References

External links
 Official website of the Ontario Junior Hockey League
 Official website of the Canadian Junior Hockey League

Metro Junior A Hockey League seasons
MetJHL